Victoria Syde Praver (born June 4, 1987) is an American model and swimwear fashion designer perhaps best known for her appearances in the 2007–2009 Sports Illustrated Swimsuit Issue, as a Global Brand Ambassador for Billabong in 2009, and for being the youngest face of Guess in 2006, at the age of 17.

Biography 
Born in San Diego, California, and raised on the Hawaiian island of Maui, Praver's childhood was spent surfing, swimming and hanging out at local beaches with her friends. Discovered at age 13 at a Lahaina supermarket, Praver has gone on to work for Guess, Yamamay, Tally Weijl, and Liu-Jo.  She has been on multiple covers of Cosmopolitan, Glamour, and Cover magazines.  She made Sports Illustrated shoots and was the object/subject of Joanne Gair body painting works in the 2007 and 2008 editions and appeared again the following year in 2009.

Her initial career goals were to become a fashion designer and in 2009, Praver started her own line of swimwear, Tori Praver Swimwear. The successful swimwear line is sold through major retailers, boutiques and online. In 2013, she married long-time boyfriend and professional surfer Danny Fuller, they separated in June 2017. The former couple share a daughter, Ryan, born in 2013, and a son, Phoenix, born in 2016, and split their time between Hawaii, Malibu and New York.

References

External links
 
 
 
 
 Profile from Askmen.com
 Tori Praver Swimwear Official website
 2012 Interview with Tori Praver
 Pacific Weddings 2013 Feature
 Swept Away: Model Tori Praver and Surfer Danny Fuller's Hawaiian Wedding from Vogue

1987 births
Living people
Female models from California
People from San Diego
American female models
IMG Models models
21st-century American women